Alex Hughes (born Solihull, 22 April 1971) is an English freelance cartoonist, caricaturist and illustrator, whose work is published in Tribune and has been used in PC Pro, Red Pepper and by the BBC's The Midlands at Westminster and Five's Live With Christian O'Connell. He lives in Smethwick, Birmingham, England.

Hughes has an MA in Visual Communications (cartooning) from UCE Birmingham and was Treasurer of the Professional Cartoonists' Organisation. He works from home, having formerly had a studio in Birmingham's Custard Factory.

Publications
Learn to Draw Caricatures HarperCollins, 1999, 
, 2007, 
Drawing Cartoons John Byrne, Alex Hughes & Janet Nunn, Collins

Contributions
Drawing Cartoons That Sell, John Byrne,

External links
Hughes' website

References

1971 births
Alumni of Birmingham Institute of Art and Design
Culture in Birmingham, West Midlands
English caricaturists
English cartoonists
English illustrators
Mass media in Birmingham, West Midlands
People from Birmingham, West Midlands
Living people